Cecil Douglas Ayling (1912 — 1990) was an Argentine first-class cricketer.

From a large cricket playing Anglo-Argentine family, which included his brother Cyril and Dennet. In December 1937 and January 1938, Ayling made three appearances in first-class cricket for Argentina against Sir Theodore Brinckman's personal eleven which was touring South America. The three-match series was drawn 1–1, with Ayling scoring 228 runs and recording two half centuries, with a highest score of 75. Ayling died in Argentina in 1990.

References

External links

1912 births
1990 deaths
Argentine people of English descent
Argentine cricketers